Valentinus (died 644) was a Byzantine general and usurper.

Biography
According to Sebeos, Valentinus was of Armenian origin, being descended from the royal Arsacid clan. He was initially a member of the retinue of the sakellarios Philagrius, and was tasked in early 641 by Emperor Constantine III (r. February–May 641) to distribute money to the troops in order to secure their loyalty to his infant son Constans, and not the faction of Heraclius's empress-dowager Martina. It is possible that he had been appointed as general or plenipotentiary over the Byzantine army, or that he held the post of comes Obsequii.

In the event, however, on Emperor Constantine's death in May 641, Martina and her son Heraklonas seized power, whilst the loyalists of Constans, most prominently Philagrius, were banished. At this point, Valentinus, who had carried out his assignment and secured the support of the army, led the troops to Chalcedon, across the Bosporus from Constantinople, and demanded that Constans be made co-emperor. Bowing to this pressure, in late September Constans was crowned co-emperor by Heraklonas. In an effort to reduce the importance of this act, however, Heraklonas also had two of his younger brothers, David and Marinus, raised to the rank of co-emperor at the same time. Valentinus himself was "rewarded" by being given the title of comes excubitorum. Nevertheless, according to Sebeos's account, it was Valentinus who engineered the final fall and mutilation of Martina and Heraklonas a few months later, and imposed Constans as sole Byzantine emperor.

By early 642, Valentinus was therefore the most powerful man in the Byzantine Empire, and was apparently rendered quasi-imperial honours, most notably by being allowed to wear the imperial purple. At the same time, he was appointed commander-in-chief of the Byzantine army, and his daughter Fausta was married to the young Emperor Constans II and proclaimed Augusta. In 643/644, Valentinus led a campaign against the Arabs, reportedly in a concerted pincer movement with another army under an Armenian general named David. Valentinus's army, however, was routed and he himself reportedly panicked and fled, leaving his treasury to be captured by the Arabs.

In 644 or 645, Valentinus attempted to usurp his son-in-law's throne. He appeared at Constantinople with a contingent of troops, and demanded to be crowned emperor. His bid for the throne, however, failed, since both the capital's populace and the leading men of the state, Patriarch Paul II foremost, rejected his claim. According to the chroniclers, the populace lynched his envoy Antoninos, before proceeding to kill Valentinus himself.

References

Sources

Further reading

644 deaths
7th-century Byzantine people
Heraclian dynasty
Byzantine generals
Byzantine usurpers
Byzantine people of Armenian descent
Comites excubitorum
Byzantine people of the Arab–Byzantine wars
Year of birth unknown